While Mortals Sleep may refer to:

 While Mortals Sleep (book), a book by Kurt Vonnegut
 While Mortals Sleep (album), an album by Kate Rusby